Zach Underwood is an American mixed martial artist. He competed in the bantamweight, featherweight and lightweight divisions.

Mixed martial arts record

|-
| Loss
| align=center| 13-7
| Jason Williams
| TKO (punches)
| World Series of Fighting 27: Firmino vs. Fodor
| 
| align=center| 1
| align=center| 1:27
| Memphis, Tennessee, United States
| 
|-
| Win
| align=center| 13-6
| Dawond Pickney
| Decision (unanimous)
| SFC: Summit Fighting Championships 9
| 
| align=center| 3
| align=center| 5:00
| Southaven, Mississippi, United States
| 
|-
| Loss
| align=center| 12-6
| Austin Lyons
| Technical Decision (unanimous)
| Bellator 120
| 
| align=center| 3
| align=center| 3:25
| Southaven, Mississippi, United States
| 
|-
| Win
| align=center| 12-5
| Tony Way
| Decision (unanimous)
| V3 Fights: Johnson vs. Johnson
| 
| align=center| 3
| align=center| 5:00
| Memphis, Tennessee, United States
| 
|-
| Loss
| align=center| 11-5
| Luke Sanders
| TKO (punches)
| XFC 26: Night of Champions 3
| 
| align=center| 2
| align=center| 3:38
| Nashville, Tennessee, United States
| 
|-
| Win
| align=center| 11-4
| Deivison Francisco Ribeiro
| Decision (unanimous)
| XFC 23: Louisville Slugfest
| 
| align=center| 3
| align=center| 5:00
| Louisville, Kentucky, United States
| 
|-
| Win
| align=center| 10-4
| Chris Coggins
| Decision (unanimous)
| Bellator LXXIII
| 
| align=center| 3
| align=center| 5:00
| Tunica, Mississippi, United States
| 
|-
| Win
| align=center| 9-4
| Jimmy Van Horn
| TKO (punches)
| Prize Fight Promotions: Mid South MMA Championships 6
| 
| align=center| 1
| align=center| 4:33
| Southaven, Mississippi, United States
| 
|-
| Loss
| align=center| 8-4
| Mike Santiago
| Decision (unanimous)
| NAFC: Mayhem
| 
| align=center| 3
| align=center| 5:00
| Milwaukee, Wisconsin, United States
| 
|-
| Win
| align=center| 8-3
| Matt Traylor
| Decision (split)
| Sportfight X: Middle Tennessee Mayhem
| 
| align=center| 3
| align=center| 5:00
| Murfreesboro, Tennessee, United States
| 
|-
| Loss
| align=center| 7-3
| Austin Lyons
| Decision (split)
| Empire FC: A Night of Reckoning 4
| 
| align=center| 5
| align=center| 5:00
| Tunica, Mississippi, United States
| 
|-
| Win
| align=center| 7-2
| Hunter Worsham
| Decision (unanimous)
| Strikeforce: Nashville
| 
| align=center| 3
| align=center| 5:00
| Nashville, Tennessee, United States
| 
|-
| Win
| align=center| 6-2
| Terry Robinson
| Decision (unanimous)
| Empire FC: A Night of Reckoning 2
| 
| align=center| 3
| align=center| 5:00
| Tunica, Mississippi, United States
| 
|-
| Loss
| align=center| 5-2
| Josh Shaffer
| KO (punch)
| H.B. Dick: Promotions
| 
| align=center| 1
| align=center| 2:14
| Murray, Kentucky, United States
| 
|-
| Win
| align=center| 5-1
| Tommy Roberts
| Decision (unanimous)
| Relentless MMA: Union City Fight Night 5
| 
| align=center| 3
| align=center| 5:00
| Union City, Tennessee, United States
| 
|-
| Win
| align=center| 4-1
| Nathan Waites
| TKO (punches)
| HTF: Harrah's Tunica Fights
| 
| align=center| 1
| align=center| 1:08
| Robinsonville, Mississippi, United States
| 
|-
| Win
| align=center| 3-1
| Jason Powers
| TKO (punches)
| LAE: Lethal Assault Cagefighting
| 
| align=center| 1
| align=center| 0:35
| Kennett, Missouri, United States
| 
|-
| Win
| align=center| 2-1
| Dan Bulkley
| Decision (unanimous)
| CA: Battlegrounds
| 
| align=center| 3
| align=center| 5:00
| Millington, Tennessee, United States
| 
|-
| Loss
| align=center| 1-1
| Chris Coggins
| Decision (unanimous)
| H.B. Dick: Promotions
| 
| align=center| 3
| align=center| 5:00
| Paducah, Kentucky, United States
| 
|-
| Win
| align=center| 1-0
| Omar Sutton
| Decision (majority)
| Cage Assault: Bragging Rights
| 
| align=center| 3
| align=center| 5:00
| Memphis, Tennessee, United States
|

See also
List of male mixed martial artists

References

External links
 Zach Underwood at MMAjunkie.com
 
 
 

American male mixed martial artists
Bantamweight mixed martial artists
Featherweight mixed martial artists
Lightweight mixed martial artists
Living people
Year of birth missing (living people)